|}

The Cheshire Oaks is a Listed flat horse race in Great Britain open to three-year-old fillies. It is run over a distance of 1 mile, 3 furlongs and 75 yards at Chester in May.

History
The event was established in 1950, and it was originally contested over 1 mile, 4 furlongs and 53 yards. The inaugural running was won by Requete.

The Cheshire Oaks was extended by several yards in 1970. It held Group 3 status from 1971 to 1985. It was relegated to Listed level in 1986.

The race was scheduled to be run over 1 mile, 4 furlongs and 65 yards in 1988, but it was abandoned due to waterlogging. It was cut by about a furlong in 1989.

The current trophy is named in memory of Robert Sangster (1936–2004), a successful owner-breeder of racehorses. The Robert Sangster Memorial Cup was first presented in 2005.

The Cheshire Oaks can serve as a trial for the Epsom Oaks. The last horse to win both races was Enable in 2017. The last participant to win the Oaks was Forever Together, the 2018 runner-up.

Records

Leading jockey since 1960 (6 wins):
 Pat Eddery – One Over Parr (1975), African Dancer (1976), Braiswick (1989), Peplum (1991), Bolas (1994), Valentine Girl (1999)

Leading trainer since 1960 (7 wins):
 Barry Hills – Dibidale (1974), Chaudennay (1987), Aquamarine (1992), Bolas (1994), High and Low (1998), Valentine Girl (1999), Alumni (2005)
 Aidan O'Brien - Sail (2008), Perfect Truth (2009), Wonder Of Wonders (2011), Diamondsandrubies (2015), Somehow (2016), Magic Wand (2018), Thoughts Of June (2022)

Winners since 1980

Earlier winners

 1950: Requete
 1951: Queen of Sheba
 1952: Good Earth
 1953: Brolly
 1954: Amora
 1955: Lark
 1956: Fairy Grove
 1957: Mulberry Harbour
 1958: Scryer
 1959: Cantelo
 1960: Courtesan
 1961: Bernie
 1962: Tropic Star
 1963: Elite Royale
 1964: Paddy's Song
 1965: Bell Top
 1966: Lucaya
 1967: Pink Gem
 1968: Hardiesse
 1969: no race
 1970: Lupe
 1971: Yelda
 1972: Coral Beach
 1973: Milly Moss
 1974: Dibidale
 1975: One Over Parr
 1976: African Dancer
 1977: Brightly
 1978: Princess Eboli
 1979: L'Ile du Reve

See also
 Horse racing in Great Britain
 List of British flat horse races

References

 Paris-Turf:
 Racing Post:

 galopp-sieger.de – Cheshire Oaks.
 [http:/`/www.pedigreequery.com/index.php?search_bar=stakes&query_type=stakes&field=view&id=1027 pedigreequery.com] – Cheshire Oaks – Chester.

Flat horse races for three-year-old fillies
Chester Racecourse
Flat races in Great Britain
1950 establishments in England
Recurring sporting events established in 1950